In mathematics, the base flow of a random dynamical system is the dynamical system defined on the "noise" probability space that describes how to "fast forward" or "rewind" the noise when one wishes to change the time at which one "starts" the random dynamical system.

Definition
In the definition of a random dynamical system, one is given a family of maps  on a probability space . The measure-preserving dynamical system  is known as the base flow of the random dynamical system. The maps  are often known as shift maps since they "shift" time. The base flow is often ergodic.

The parameter  may be chosen to run over 
  (a two-sided continuous-time dynamical system);
  (a one-sided continuous-time dynamical system);
  (a two-sided discrete-time dynamical system);
  (a one-sided discrete-time dynamical system).

Each map  is required
 to be a -measurable function: for all , 
 to preserve the measure : for all , .

Furthermore, as a family, the maps  satisfy the relations
In particular,  if  exists.

In other words, the maps  form a commutative monoid (in the cases  and ) or a commutative group (in the cases  and ).

Example
In the case of random dynamical system driven by a Wiener process , where  is the two-sided classical Wiener space, the base flow  would be given by

.

This can be read as saying that  "starts the noise at time  instead of time 0".

Random dynamical systems